South Bruce Peninsula is not to be confused with the Municipality of South Bruce, Ontario

South Bruce Peninsula is a town at the base of the Bruce Peninsula of Ontario, Canada, in Bruce County between Lake Huron and Georgian Bay. It was formed on January 1, 1999, when the town of Wiarton, the village of Hepworth, and the townships of Albemarle and Amabel were amalgamated. This new municipality was created to provide necessary political representation, administrative support and necessary municipal services on behalf of the residents.

Tourism, particularly cottage rental and providing services to visitors, is the major industry in the area.  Many cottages are found along Sauble Beach (North and South).

Communities
The town comprises a number of villages and larger communities. These include the following:

 Albemarle Ward: Adamsville, Colpoys Bay, Hope Bay, Howdenvale, Mar, Purple Valley, Red Bay; McIver
 Amabel Ward: Allenford, Clavering, Elsinore, Hepworth, Oliphant, Park Head, Sauble Beach, Wiarton; French Bay, Sauble Beach South, Sauble Falls, Skipness, Tolmie

The administrative centre of the region is found in Wiarton.

Town politics and services
An elected mayor, deputy major and three councilors provide the municipal government, guided by provincial legislation. A number of Committees and local Boards assist Council. "Council establishes policies and budgets for programs and services delivered by the Town of South Bruce Peninsula." The Legislative Services Department includes the Clerk's Division, By-Law Enforcement and Animal Control, and the Building Division.

The Town's Community-Based Strategic Plan, Creating Our Future, was originally completed in 2012 and was updated in 2014 and 2016. The intent is to "ensure the protection of the natural resources while balancing the desire for business, tourism and recreational opportunities."

The Parks & Recreation Department services parks, playgrounds, athletic fields, ball diamonds, arena, aquatic programs and various programs. The town has Fire stations but policing is provided by the Ontario Provincial Police from the Wiarton Detachment.

There has been some friction between the Town and the Saugeen First Nation because of continuing land claims in the Sauble Beach area. A settlement was mediated in 2014 but was subsequently rejected by South Bruce, leading to a lawsuit against the Town, to be heard in court no earlier than 2018.

There is one hospital in the town: Wiarton Hospital with emergency and ambulance services, with 14 beds. Nearby, though outside the town, is the Grey-Bruce Regional Health Centre in Owen Sound. The latter is larger and is the regional referral centre for Grey and Bruce counties with over 50 specialists on staff.

Land ownership, Sauble Beach
Sauble Beach is the permanent year-round home to approximately 2,000 people. The cottage owners add thousands of seasonal community members. Cottage owners are uniquely split between those who own property outright and those with cottages on Native lands. (Years earlier, the Saugeen First Nation had successfully reclaimed the land that "runs south from the Sauble Beach sign toward Southampton, 18 kilometres away", according to one news report.) A lease relationship exists between the Saugeen First Nation, the "Chippewas of Saugeen", and cottagers who built seasonal homes on leased land in the a lakeside area between urban Southampton, Ontario and Sauble Beach. They pay an annual fee to the Saugeen First Nation. The current land lease agreement between the cottagers and the Saugeen First Nation remains in effect until April 30, 2021.

Some years ago, the Saugeen First Nation successfully reclaimed the land that "runs south from the Sauble Beach sign toward Southampton, 18 kilometres away", according to one news report. The beach area to the south of Main St. in the community is referred to by the band as Sauble Park or South Sauble Beach Park. In addition to the south Sauble Beach, Ontario area, the Saugeen First Nation claims the rights to another stretch of the public beach, approximately 2 km long, west of Lakeshore Boulevard extending to a point between 1st St. South and 6th St. North. This claim has been in litigation since 1990 when the federal government started an action on behalf of the Saugeen First Nation, stating that the area is part of the Saugeen 29 Reserve. The band also filed its own claim in 1995.

In 2019, the Saugeen First Nation banned the driving and parking of vehicles on their South Sauble beach; the town had done so previously on their public beach.

Demographics 

Mother tongue:
 English as first language: 94.4%
 French as first language: 0.7%
 English and French as first language: 0.5%
 Other as first language: 4.3%

Population trend:
 Population in 2016: 8,416
 Population in 2011: 8,413
 Population in 2006: 8,415
 Population in 2001: 8,090
 Population total in 1996: 8,004
 Albemarle (township): 1,217
 Amabel (township): 3,917
 Hepworth (village): 470
 Wiarton (town): 2,400
 Population in 1991:
 Albemarle (township): 1,140
 Amabel (township): 3,815
 Hepworth (village): 453
 Wiarton (town): 2,326

Attractions

The main tourist attractions for the area are Sauble Beach, Wiarton Willie (Groundhog Day), and fishing locations on Lake Huron and Georgian Bay.

The region has many annual festivals such as the Wiarton Willie Festival, held each February; the William Wilfred Campbell Poetry & Arts Festival in June; the Wiarton Rotary Village Fair, held on Civic Holiday weekend each August; the Oliphant Regatta, held each summer; Sauble Sandfest, held each August; and the Wiarton Fall Fair, held each September.

The Bruce Trail, the oldest and longest marked hiking trail in Canada, with over 440 km of side trails, runs up the eastern side of the Bruce Peninsula.

Isaac Lake Management area is north of Wiarton, Ontario.

Notable people

 Laura Emma Jamieson, pacifist and feminist

See also
List of townships in Ontario

References

External links

Towns in Ontario
Lower-tier municipalities in Ontario
Municipalities in Bruce County
1999 establishments in Ontario